Jillian Anne Ellis (born 6 September 1966) is an English-American soccer coach and executive who is currently the president of San Diego Wave FC. Ellis coached the United States women's national soccer team from 2014 to October 2019 and won two FIFA Women's World Cups in 2015 and 2019, making her the second coach to win consecutive World Cups. She stepped away from being USWNT’s head coach in October 2019 and currently serves as an ambassador for the United States Soccer Federation, with her focus being on working with the federation to help raise the number of women in coaching. She has also served as head coach for various college and United States national youth teams over her career.

Early life and playing career
Ellis did not play organised football until her family moved to the United States in 1981, as there was no organised football for girls in the UK in the 1970s. She captained the Robinson Secondary School team in Fairfax, Virginia to the 1984 state championship and won the under-19 national title with the Braddock Road Bluebelles the same summer.

She went on to play as a forward at William & Mary from 1984 to 1987, when she was named third-team All-American. She scored 32 goals during her four seasons at the school.

Coaching and administrative career
Ellis has a USSF Pro coaching licence; with coaching experiences that includes multiple stints for the under-20 and under-21 national teams, and an impressive record as a UCLA Bruins coach.
She is the Development Director of United States Soccer Federation. She served as assistant coach of the women's national team, head coach of a number of women youth teams, and was the interim coach of the senior women's national team in 2012, and for 2 matches in 2014. She was appointed the permanent head coach of United States women in May 2014.

College coaching
Ellis served as an assistant coach for three universities: at Maryland for three years, 1994–96; at Virginia for one year, 1996–97; and at NC State for another three years, 1988–90. As an assistant coach at N.C. State, Ellis helped the NC State secure the 1988 Atlantic Coast Conference title and an NCAA Women's College Cup appearance.

Ellis headed the Illinois women's soccer program for two years, 1997–1999. In 1998, she brought the Fighting Illini to a 12–8 record and a first-ever Big Ten Tournament berth.

Ellis led UCLA to eight NCAA Women's College Cups, including seven in a row from 2003–2009, and won six straight Pacific-10 Conference titles from 2003–2008. She finished her time in Westwood with a record of 229 wins, 45 losses and 14 draws (229–45–14). She was the 2000 NSCAA National Coach of the Year after leading the Bruins to the NCAA championship game in just her second season as head coach.

Ellis has an all-time collegiate coaching record of 248 wins, 63 losses and 14 draws (248–63–14), compiled over 14 years with the Illinois Fighting Illini and UCLA Bruins.

National youth teams manager
Ellis was the head coach of the United States under-21 women's national football teams, coaching a team to win the Nordic Cup title at Germany 2000 and to Sweden's 2005 Nordic Cup. In another stint as youth team's head coach, she guided the U.S. under-20 women’s national team to the CONCACAF title in 2010 and to the FIFA U-20 Women's World Cup in Germany.

National Development Director
Ellis was appointed by U.S. Soccer as Development Director for the U.S. women's national teams in January 2011. The appointment, along with April Heinrichs as Technical Director, marked the first time U.S. Soccer had appointed full-time positions to oversee the programs and development of national women's youth teams.

As Development Director, Ellis interacts directly with coaches within the youth club leagues and guides the U.S. under-17, under-15 and under-14 teams.

National team manager 
Ellis was a scout for the U.S. women's national team at the Sydney 2000 Olympics, and while coach of the UCLA Bruins Ellis also served as an assistant coach under Pia Sundhage for the gold medal-winning U.S. women’s national team at the Beijing 2008 Olympics.

2012 interim coach 
Following Sundhage's departure on 1 September 2012, for Sweden, Ellis (as women's national team program development director) served as the interim head coach until U.S. Soccer hired Tom Sermanni as the full-time head coach on 1 January 2013.

Ellis's first appearances as head coach of United States women's national soccer team was against Germany, on 20 October 2012, at Bridgeview, Illinois, and on 23 October at Hartford, Connecticut. The international friendly matches were part of a series organized to celebrate the winning of the gold medal at the 2012 Olympics. The first match finished at 1–1 and the second at 2–2.

With a match against China on 15 December 2012, Ellis completed her first stint as interim head coach of U.S. women's national team with 5 wins, 2 draws, and no loss.

2014 interim coach 
On 6 April 2014, U.S. Soccer announced the firing of Tom Sermanni and re-appointment of Ellis as interim head coach of the United States women's national soccer team. As interim head coach in 2014, Ellis had a 3–0 win against China and a 1–1 draw with Canada.

2014 appointment as head coach 
On 16 May 2014, U.S. Soccer announced that Ellis had been appointed as the national team's head coach on a permanent basis. Ellis's job as head coach was to qualify for the 2015 Women's World Cup and win the championship. On 5 July 2015, she coached the United States to a 5–2 victory over Japan to win the World Cup.
Ellis was honored as 2015 FIFA World Coach of the Year for Women's Football on 11 January 2016.

According to an investigation, Ellis was one of the USWNT leaders who did not take action after being told of a "hostile [coaching] environment" in 2014, and receiving in 2015 a player survey with "quite disturbing" allegations including sexual harassment.

In 2016, the U.S. women's national team recorded five shutout wins to secure the 2016 CONCACAF Women's Olympic Qualifying Championship. However, the team struggled during the 2016 Summer Olympics, drawing against Colombia in the group stage and eliminated to eventual silver medal winners Sweden — a team led by former national team coach Pia Sundhage — 4–3 on penalty kicks after drawing in regulation and extra time. The loss marked the first time that the U.S. women's national team did not advance to the gold medal game of the Olympics, as well as the first time that the team failed to advance to the semifinal round of a major tournament. The effort was further marred when U.S. goalkeeper Hope Solo called the Swedish team "cowards" for their defensive tactics. Ellis would later cite those comments as part of the reason why U.S. Soccer terminated Solo's contract and suspended her from the team.

The U.S. women's national team won four subsequent international friendly matches (9–0 against Thailand, 3–1 against the Netherlands, and 4–0 and 5–1 in two matches against Switzerland). The latter two friendlies featured the largest squad turnover of Ellis's tenure as she brought in 11 uncapped players, started or played 6 of them, and left several regular players out of camp.

Before the friendly against Thailand, Ellis asked U.S. women's national team midfielder Megan Rapinoe not to kneel during the pre-game performance of the United States national anthem. Rapinoe had done so before matches with her National Women's Soccer League team, Seattle Reign FC, prior to camp in support of other professional athletes' similar protests. Despite Ellis's request, she did not punish Rapinoe after the game.

On 7 July 2019 she led the United States Women's National Team to win its fourth World Cup and its second consecutive. In the final match against Netherlands in Lyon, France, the team won 2–0. The 2019 World Cup Champion Team beat the world record for most goals in a tournament with 26 goals. She became not only the first manager to win two Women's World Cup titles in history, but also the first national team coach, men's or women's, to have won two consecutive FIFA World Cup titles since Vittorio Pozzo guided Italy's men's national football team to two consecutive titles in both 1934 and 1938.

On 30 July 2019, U.S. Soccer announced that Ellis would be stepping down as coach of the Women's National Team. She will remain with the team through the World Cup victory tour. Following her departure, she will continue to work with U.S. Soccer in the role of Ambassador.

Coaching record

Personal life
Ellis was born in Folkestone and grew up in Cowplain, a small village near Portsmouth on the southern coast of England. She was a supporter of Manchester United, and attended Padnell Junior School and Cowplain School.  Naturally athletic, she ran track and field, and played field hockey and netball, but did not play organized soccer as it was considered "unladylike" in 1970s Britain. She would, however, tag along with her brother Paul and play with the boys whenever they needed an extra player.

Her father, John Ellis, a former Royal Marines commando, was a longtime soccer ambassador for the British government, assigned to help create soccer programs worldwide, including in Trinidad and Tobago and in Singapore. In 1981, the Ellis family moved to Northern Virginia, where he founded Soccer Academy in Manassas.
 
Her brother Paul also became a soccer coach, coaching area high school teams and serving as an assistant coach at George Mason before taking a full-time position at Soccer Academy Inc.

Ellis earned a Bachelor of Arts degree in English Literature and Composition at the College of William and Mary in 1988. She was awarded an honorary Doctor of Humane Letters degree in 2016, and was inducted into Omicron Delta Kappa as an alumni member at the College of William and Mary in 2019. She also did work towards a master's degree in technical writing at North Carolina State University. Her mother Margaret "was horrified", on learning of her plan to give up her lucrative job as a technical writer at Northern Telecom to work as an assistant coach with subsistence pay, while John advised her to "do something substantial" instead.

Ellis lives in Palmetto Bay, Florida, a suburb of Miami, with her wife Betsy Stephenson, whom she married in 2013, and their adopted daughter Lily Stephenson-Ellis.  Ellis, along with her parents and brother, are naturalized American citizens.

Honors
 Third-Team All-American in 1987 at College of William and Mary

Managerial honors
Collegiate
As assistant coach of NC State Wolfpack:
 1988 Atlantic Coast Conference title

As head coach of UCLA Bruins:
 The 2000 NSCAA National Coach of the Year
 Six straight Pacific-10 Conference titles from 2003–08

United States Women

As coach of youth teams:
 Nordic Cup title at Germany 2000 under-21 tournament
 2010 under-20 CONCACAF title

As assistant coach of senior team:
 Beijing 2008 Olympic Gold medal

As head coach of senior team:
 2014 CONCACAF Women's Championship (1st place)
 2015 Algarve Cup (1st place)
 FIFA Women's World Cup: 2015, 2019
 2015 CONCACAF Women's Coach of the Year
 2015, 2019 FIFA World Women's Coach of the Year

See also

 Vittorio Pozzo, the first manager to win FIFA World Cup consecutively while coaching the same team.
 2010 FIFA U-20 Women's World Cup squads
 2014 CONCACAF Women's Championship squads

References

Match reports

External links

 U.S. Soccer coach biography

1966 births
Living people
United States women's national soccer team managers
Pan American Games competitors for the United States
English emigrants to the United States
William & Mary Tribe women's soccer players
American women's soccer coaches
2015 FIFA Women's World Cup managers
People from Folkestone
Footballers from Kent
Footballers from Portsmouth
North Carolina State University alumni
UCLA Bruins women's soccer coaches
Illinois Fighting Illini women's soccer coaches
Lesbian sportswomen
LGBT association football players
American LGBT sportspeople
English LGBT sportspeople
FIFA Women's World Cup-winning managers
LGBT people from Virginia
Female association football managers
People from Palmetto Bay, Florida
Women's association football forwards
American women's soccer players
Robinson Secondary School alumni
2019 FIFA Women's World Cup managers
American Olympic coaches
National Women's Soccer League executives
English people of Scottish descent